Polycyclic may refer to:

 Polycyclic compound, a cyclic compound with more than one hydrocarbon loop or ring structures, including:
 Polycyclic musks
 Polycyclic aromatic hydrocarbon
 Chlorinated polycyclic aromatic hydrocarbon
 Contorted polycyclic aromatic hydrocarbon

 Polycyclic group, in mathematics, a solvable group that satisfies the maximal condition on subgroups

 Polycyclic spawning, when an animal reproduces multiple times during its lifespan